Saint Sidronius (died ) was a Roman martyr. His life is confused with a French saint of the same name. His feast date is 8 September or 11 July.

Church

The village of Saint-Cydroine in the commune of Laroche-Saint-Cydroine near Sens in Yonne, France, is named after the saint.
It is said that Sidronius was martyred here by the Romans, and a spring here with miraculous powers was a place of pilgrimage in the Middle Ages.
The Saint Cydroine Church is an 11th- or 12th-century Romanesque church with an octagonal tower in the village dedicated to the saint.
It was founded by the abbey of La Charité-sur-Loire.

Monks of Ramsgate account

The monks of St Augustine's Abbey, Ramsgate, wrote in their Book of Saints (1921),

Baring-Gould's account

Sabine Baring-Gould (1834–1924) wrote in his Lives of the Saints (1897),

Butler's account

The hagiographer Alban Butler ( 1710–1773) wrote in his Lives of the Primitive Fathers, Martyrs, and Other Principal Saints, under April 9,

Notes

Sources

 
 
 

Saints from Roman Italy
270 deaths